Scott Park Manley (born 31 December 1972) is a Scottish science communication YouTuber, gamer, astrophysicist, and programmer. On his YouTube channel, he makes videos discussing space-related topics and news, mainly concerning up-to-date rocket science developments. He also plays space-themed video games, most notably Kerbal Space Program, while using his physics background to teach science concepts.

He is known among his followers as the "astronogamer", as he is one of the few YouTubers blending both video games and science, and is popular in the niche community of space enthusiasts and gamers, especially among Kerbal Space Program players.

Education and professional career
While studying at the University of Glasgow, Manley received a Bachelor of Science (1990–1994) in physics and astronomy, and a Master of Science (1994–1995) in computational physics. In 2002, he worked as an engineer for Napster. From 2002 to 2004, he worked as a research engineer for Qualys. From 2004 to 2009, he worked as a security architect in imeem, where he developed and maintained an audio and video uploading, transcoding, and fingerprinting system, among other things. Manley is currently employed at Apple Inc. He joined Topsy Labs in 2009 and in 2013, Apple acquired Topsy.

YouTube career
Manley's first few uploads on his YouTube channel, "szyzyg", were assorted home movies that were primarily of his daughter, Skye.

A video titled "Asteroid Discovery From 1980 - 2010" was one of Manley's early YouTube successes. The video is a computer animation showing a time-lapse of the Solar System from 1980-2010. When the time-lapse reaches the day an asteroid is discovered, it appears on the map as a bright green dot and continues orbiting the sun. The video amassed over 459,000 views in the five days following its upload. By September 3, 2010, the szyzyg channel had 213 subscribers, earning Manley the accolade "#66 - Most Viewed (This Week)".

Some time before November 23, 2011, he changed the name of his YouTube channel to "Scott Manley". Scott's later successes came from gaming content, specifically videos about Kerbal Space Program, a spaceflight simulator with accurate Newtonian physics. Kerbal Space Program is a sandbox game featuring players constructing rockets out of prefabricated parts, attempting to launch them into orbit and explore the solar system of Kerbin. The game has a very steep learning curve due to the accurate Newtonian physics engine. Scott used his scientific background to make tutorial videos on basic gameplay, such as how to reach Kerbin orbit. Later, Manley would go on to play other games such as Elite Dangerous, EVE Online, and Surviving Mars, approaching them from his unique professional science perspective.

Around 2018, Manley slowly transitioned away from gaming content, and began focusing heavily on the history of spaceflight and current events in the industry. As of 2022, these subjects are his current main focus, alongside regular Q&A videos submitted by his patrons on Patreon. Manley still streams games weekly on Twitch under the name "Szyzyg".

Author Anne McCaffrey consulted with Manley on the effects of asteroid impacts while writing The Skies of Pern. Manley determined the orbit of a fictional rogue comet and provided advice on how the event should be portrayed. Manley was one of the original participants of Asteroid Day, was a keynote speaker at the launch in 2015, and hosted their regular "Asteroid Update" segments. He is credited as a consultant on the Netflix movie Stowaway (directed by Joe Penna). In Penna's appearance on Corridor Cast, he said Manley would go beyond the immediate needs of the script and that he 'did the math so it would be ready'.

Asteroid named after Scott Manley 
In recognition for his work as a popular science communicator, asteroid 33434 Scottmanley was named after him. The official  was published by the Minor Planet Center on 18 May 2019. The outer main-belt asteroid was discovered by astronomers with the OCA–DLR Asteroid Survey in 1999. It is a member of the stony Koronis family and measures approximately 4.6 kilometers in diameter.

References

 

1972 births
Living people
Alumni of the University of Glasgow
British astrophysicists
British computer programmers
British musicians
Educational and science YouTubers
Gaming YouTubers
Male bloggers
People from Troon
Science communicators
Scottish DJs
Scottish engineers
Scottish expatriates in the United States
Scottish game players
Scottish YouTubers
Video bloggers
Video game commentators